Mount Tukosmera is the tallest mountain on Tanna, Vanuatu. It is located in the southern part of the island. It was a volcano in the Pleistocene, but is no longer active, unlike Mount Yasur. The mountain has special religious significance for the adherents of the John Frum movement, as a place from which gods come.

Important Bird Area

A  tract of the upper slopes of the mountain has been recognised as an Important Bird Area (IBA) by BirdLife International because it contains a breeding site for a population of collared petrels.

References

Mountains of Vanuatu
Volcanoes of Vanuatu
Pleistocene volcanoes
Important Bird Areas of Vanuatu
Seabird colonies